David Kearney (died 1624) was an Irish prelate of the Roman Catholic Church. He served as the Archbishop of Cashel from 1603 to 1624.

He was appointed the archbishop of the Metropolitan see of Cashel on 21 May 1603 and received episcopal consecration on 31 August 1603.

He died in Rome on 14 August 1624.

References

Bibliography

 
 

1624 deaths
Roman Catholic archbishops of Cashel
17th-century Roman Catholic archbishops in Ireland
Year of birth unknown